Bobby Gilfillan may refer to:

Bobby Gilfillan (footballer, born 1926) (1926–2018), Scottish professional footballer
Bobby Gilfillan (footballer, born 1938), Scottish professional footballer

See also
Robert Gilfillan, Scottish poet and songwriter